This is a list of launches made by the R-7 Semyorka ICBM, and its derivatives between 1985 and 1989. All launches are orbital satellite launches, unless stated otherwise.



References